The Vrdnik-Ravanica Monastery, also known as Little Ravanica (Мала Раваница / Mala Ravanica), is a Serbian Orthodox monastery in Vrdnik in the Fruška Gora mountains in the northern Serbia, in the province of Vojvodina. The exact date of its founding is unknown. The records indicate that the church was built at the time of Metropolitan Serafim Jovanović, in the second half of the 16th century. The present church in the monastery was constructed in the period from 1801 to 1811. The icons on the altar screen and the vaults were painted by Dimitrije Avramović in 1853.

Vrdnik-Ravanica Monastery was declared Monument of Culture of Exceptional Importance in 1990, and it is protected by Republic of Serbia.

See also
Monasteries of Fruška Gora - Fruškać
Monument of Culture of Exceptional Importance
Tourism in Serbia
Monasteries of Fruška Gora
List of Serbian Orthodox monasteries

References

External links

Vrdnik monastery - Fruškać
More about the monastery (in Serbian)

Cultural Monuments of Exceptional Importance (Serbia)
Serbian Orthodox monasteries in Serbia